The economy of Saudi Arabia is the largest in the Middle East and the eighteenth largest in the world. A permanent and founding member of OPEC, Saudi Arabia is also a member of the G20 forum as one of the world's largest economies.

Saudi Arabia reportedly has the third most valuable natural resource reserves in the world, mostly petroleum and natural gas. The kingdom has the second-largest proven petroleum reserves, and the fourth-largest measured natural gas reserves. Saudi Arabia is currently the largest exporter of petroleum in the world, which sees it occasionally referred to as a petrostate in Western media. Other major parts of the economy include refining and chemical manufacturing from the oil reserves, much of which is vertically integrated in the state-owned enterprise, Saudi Aramco.

In 2016, the Saudi government launched its Saudi Vision 2030 program to reduce its dependency on oil and diversify its economic resources. In the first quarter of 2019, Saudi Arabia's budget had its first surplus since 2016. This surplus of $10.10 billion was achieved due to an increase in oil and non-oil revenues.

Economic overview 
The following table shows the main economic indicators in 1980–2021 (with IMF staff estimates in 2022–2027). Inflation under 5% is in green.

Saudi oil reserves are the second largest in the world (after Brazilian–Venezuelan oil reserves), and Saudi Arabia is the world's leading oil exporter and second-largest oil producer. Proven reserves, according to figures provided by the Saudi government, are estimated to be , which is about one-quarter of the world oil reserves. Petroleum in Saudi Arabia is not only plentiful but also located under pressure close to the earth's surface, which makes it less expensive and more profitable to extract compared to other places. The petroleum sector accounts for roughly 87% of Saudi budget revenues, 90% of export earnings, and 42% of GDP. Saudi Arabia's oil reserves and production are largely managed by the state-owned corporation Saudi Aramco.

Another 40% of the GDP comes from the private sector. An estimated 7.5 (2013) million foreigners work legally in Saudi Arabia and play a crucial role in developing the Saudi economy, for example in the oil and service sectors. The government has been encouraging the growth of the private sector for many years to decrease the kingdom's dependence on oil and to increase employment opportunities for the swelling Saudi population. In recent decades, the government started allowing private sector activity and foreign investor participation in certain sectors, such as power generation and telecommunications, and acceded to the World Trade Organization. During much of the 2000s, high oil prices allowed the government to post budget surpluses and boost spending on job training and education, infrastructure development, and government salaries.

With its absolute monarchy, large state sector, and supply of welfare benefits, the Saudi economy has been described asː

The gross domestic product and real gross domestic income of Saudi Arabia fluctuates dramatically according to the oil price. Mean wages were $14.74 per man-hour in 2009.

History
Saudi Arabia was a subsistence economy until the 1930s. In 1933, the Saudi government signed an oil concession agreement with the Standard Oil Company of California. The development of oil fields continued in Saudi Arabia, managed mainly byArabian American Oil Company (Aramco), a company formed by the partnership of Texaco and Chevron. In 1951, the first offshore field in the Middle East was established by Aramco at Raʾs Al-Saffāniyyah area. By 1949, Saudi oil production reached 500,000 barrels per day (bpd) and rose rapidly to 1 million bpd in 1954. Moreover, in 1951, Aramco started operating the Trans-Arabian Pipeline that moved oil from the eastern region of Saudi Arabia to the Mediterranean Sea through Jordan, Syria, and Lebanon. However, in 1981, this line was no longer used after a new line began operations that linked Jubail on the Persian Gulf and Yanbu on the Red Sea. The new pipe contributed greatly to speed up oil transport. In 1960, OPEC was established, with Saudi Arabia as one of its founding members. During the 1973 oil crisis, the price of oil rose from $3 per barrel to nearly $12, and the Saudi economy started growing rapidly, with GDP increasing from approximately $15 billion in 1973 to almost $184 billion by 1981. After gradually purchasing Aramco assets, the Saudi government nationalized the company in 1980. In 1988, Saudi Aramco was established to take over the responsibilities of Aramco.

In 1980, the price of oil peaked, and demand started decreasing as a result of recessions in industrialized nations and more efficient oil use, which produced surpluses. This created a worldwide oil glut, with the price of oil dropping from approximately $36 per barrel in 1980 to approximately $14 by 1986. Budgetary deficits developed, and the government drew down its foreign assets. As a result of the oil glut and the pressure from declines in production, after 1985 Saudi Arabia started enforcing production quotas more harshly for the OPEC members.

In June 1993, Saudi Aramco absorbed the state marketing and refining company (SAMAREC), becoming the world's largest fully integrated oil company. Most Saudi oil is exported by tankers from oil terminals at Ras Tanura and Ju'aymah in the Persian Gulf. The remaining oil for export is transported via the east–west pipeline across the kingdom to the Red Sea port of Yanbu. A major new gas initiative was supposed to attract significant investments from the American and European oil companies to develop non-associated gas fields in three separate parts of Saudi Arabia. Following final technical agreements with concession awardees in December 2001, development was expected to begin in 2002.

However, beginning in late 1997, Saudi Arabia again faced the challenge of low oil prices. Because of a combination of factors—the East Asian economic crises, a warm winter in the West caused by El Niño, and an increase in non-OPEC oil production—demand for oil decreased and pulled oil prices down by more than one-third.

Saudi Arabia was a key player in coordinating the successful 1999 campaign of OPEC and other oil-producing countries to raise the oil price to its highest level since the (Persian) Gulf War by managing petroleum supply and production. That same year, Saudi Arabia established the Supreme Economic Council to formulate and better coordinate economic development policies to accelerate institutional and industrial reforms.

Saudi Arabia joined the World Trade Organization (WTO) in 2005 after many years of negotiations.

Foreign investment
Before 2000, there were strict limits placed on foreign direct investment in Saudi Arabia. The 1979 Foreign Investment Act prohibited foreign ownership in some sectors of the economy, allowed foreign investment only if the investor qualified for a license based on their expertise, and gave priority to businesses that were Saudi-owned or partially Saudi-owned.

However, in the mid 1990s, foreign ownership rules were relaxed, with investment sought in telecommunications, utilities, and financial services. The 2000 Foreign Direct Investment Act made substantial changes to the rules on foreign investment, including allowing projects to be run by 100% foreign-owned companies for the first time.

Since 2008, extensive Saudi land investment has taken place, especially in Africa. For more, see the section on the Non-petroleum sector.

According to UNCTAD's June 2018 report, Saudi Arabia's foreign direct investment was only $1.4 billion in 2017, down from $7.5 billion the year before and as much as $12.2 billion in 2012. The fall in investment is attributed to negative intra-company loans by foreign multinationals and various divestments. In the first quarter of 2018, net capital outflows were running at approximately 5% of GDP, compared to less than 2% of GDP in late 2016. However, according to a report published in Trading Economics, in the second quarter of 2018, foreign direct investment in the country raised by $882 million. Moreover, SAGIA's data indicate that licenses provided to foreign investment increased by 130% in the first quarter of 2018 as a result of reforms in the economy.

As Saudi oil income declined in the late 2010s, the kingdom's international debt soared. In December 2018, Saudi Arabia announced it would be issuing bonds worth approximately 120 billion riyals ($32 billion) to cover its 4.2% GDP deficit of 131 billion riyals. In January 2019, the kingdom sold bonds worth $7.5 billion. In almost two and a half years, bonds worth $60 billion were sold by Saudi, which became one of the biggest borrowers globally.

Foreign investments in the kingdom witnessed a rapid increase in the first quarter of 2019. The number of new licenses approved for foreign businesses grew 70% over 2018. Most licenses were approved for British and Chinese companies, which drove the increase. In the first quarter of 2019, foreign investment in Saudi Arabia jumped by 28%.

Diversification and the development plans
The government has sought to allocate its petroleum income to transform its relatively undeveloped, oil-based economy into a modern industrial state, while maintaining the kingdom's traditional Islamic values and customs. Although economic planners have not achieved all their goals, the economy has progressed rapidly. Oil wealth has increased the standard of living of most Saudis. However, significant population growth has strained the government's ability to finance further improvements in the country's standard of living. Heavy dependence on petroleum revenue continues, but industry and agriculture now account for a larger share of economic activity. The mismatch between the job skills of Saudi graduates and the needs of the private job market at all levels remains the principal obstacle to economic diversification and development; about 4.6 million non-Saudis are employed in the economy.

Saudi Arabia first began to diversify its economy to reduce dependency on oil in the 1970s as part of its first five-year development plan. Basic petrochemical industries using petroleum byproducts as feedstock were developed. The fishing villages of al-Jubail on the Persian Gulf and Yanbu on the Red Sea were developed. However, their effect on Saudi Arabia's economic fortunes has been small.

Saudi Arabia's first two development plans, covering the 1970s, emphasized infrastructure. The results were impressive—the total length of paved highways tripled, power generation increased by a factor of 28, and the capacity of the seaports grew by a factor of 10. For the third plan (1980–85), the emphasis changed. Spending on infrastructure declined, shifting instead to education, health, and social services. The share for diversifying and expanding productive sectors of the economy (primary industry) did not rise as planned, but the two industrial cities of Jubail and Yanbu—which were built around the use of the country's oil and gas to produce steel, petrochemicals, fertilizer, and refined oil products—were largely completed.

In the fourth plan (1985–90), the country's basic infrastructure was viewed as largely complete, but education and training remained areas of concern. Private enterprise was encouraged, and foreign investment in the form of joint ventures with Saudi public and private companies was welcomed. The private sector became more important, rising to 70% of non-oil GDP by 1987. While still concentrated in trade and commerce, private investment increased in industry, agriculture, banking, and construction companies. These private investments were supported by generous government financing and incentive programs. The objective was for the private sector to have 70% to 90% ownership in most joint venture enterprises.

The fifth plan (1990–95) emphasized consolidation of the country's defences; improved and more efficient government social services; regional development; and, most importantly, creating greater private-sector employment opportunities for Saudis by reducing the number of foreign workers.

The sixth plan (1996–2000) focused on lowering the cost of government services without cutting them and sought to expand educational training programs. The plan called for reducing the kingdom's dependence on the petroleum sector by diversifying economic activity, particularly in the private sector, with special emphasis on industry and agriculture. It also continued the effort to "Saudize" the labour force.

The seventh plan (2000–2004) focused more on economic diversification and a greater role of the private sector in the Saudi economy. For 2000–04, the government aimed at an average GDP growth rate of 3.16% each year, with projected growths of 5.04% for the private sector and 4.01% for the non-oil sector. The government also set a target of creating 817,300 new jobs for Saudi nationals. By 2007, advertising expenditures had reached new peaks due to emphasis on value-added manufacturing.

In 2016, the main investing countries in Saudi Arabia were the US, UAE, France, Singapore, Kuwait, and Malaysia. They mainly invested in chemical industry, real estate, tourism, fossil fuels, automobiles, and machinery. As part of its diversification, Saudi Arabia arranged major refinery contracts with Chinese and other companies.

After Saudi Arabia became a member of the World Trade Organization (WTO) in 2005, the overall foreign investment environment in Saudi Arabia improved thanks to the kingdom's stable economy, massive oil reserves, high power of expenditure, developed infrastructure, reinforced finance, and banking system. Since then, and pursuant to its commitment to the WTO, Saudi Arabia has been developing trade-related policies and legislations. Moreover, foreign investment has been highly encouraged by Saudi Vision 2030 and its economic diversification.

Since 2017, to boost the economy and decrease the country's dependency on oil, Crown Prince Mohammed bin Salman has introduced multiple changes, such as raising the prices of gasoline and electricity, levying new taxes, and prioritizing Saudi workers over foreign workers. However, some government officials claimed the policies were causing serious ill effects on the economy. Saudi businessmen reported a decline in sales for 2018, and a few blamed the government.

In 2019, the Financial Times reported that the plans to float state-owned oil beneficiary Saudi Aramco were stranded between the company's attachment to the oil ministry and the desire to meet international standards. However, Energy Minister Khalid Al Falih has long maintained that Aramco's association with the state is a "win-win policy" for both parties.

Future
Saudi Arabia has announced plans to invest about $47 billion in three of the world's largest and most ambitious petrochemical projects. These include the $27 billion Ras Tanura integrated refinery and petrochemical project, the $9 billion Saudi Kayan petrochemical complex at Jubail Industrial City, and the $10 billion Petro Rabigh refinery upgrade project. Together, the three projects will employ more than 150,000 technicians and engineers. Upon completion in 2015–16, the Ras Tanura project would become the world's largest petrochemical facility of its kind with a combined production capacity of 11 million tons per year of different petrochemical and chemical products. The products will include ethylene, propylene, aromatics, polyethylene, ethylene oxide, chlorine derivatives, and glycol.

Saudi Arabia made plans to launch six "economic cities" (e.g., King Abdullah Economic City) in an effort to diversify the economy and provide jobs. At a total construction cost of $60 billion (2013), they were "expected to contribute $150bn to the economy".
 However, these cities have failed to attract either the population or the financial investment that the government claimed they would.

The privatization program Saudi Vision 2030 is running behind schedule. Oil prices have doubled since the government began to consider the program in 2015. Delay in Aramco's initial public offering further demonstrated a lack of urgency to privatize, even though in July 2018, the International Monetary Fund urged accelerating the process.

As Vision 2030 has been recently adopted by the Saudi government, several reforms have been undertaken, including in business environments and the financial sector. Moreover, the government has been seeking to achieve greater transparency by issuing a draft law regarding the involvement of the private sector. Other reforms have been passed to increase manpower in the private sector.

According to many reports, the Saudi government is interested in granting more liberties to the foreign investment system and giving a 100% allowance to foreign investors to work in the wholesale and retail sector in certain cases.

The Saudi Ministry of Commerce and Investment expected that the kingdom would see an increase in the GDP per capita from US$20,700 to $33,500 by 2020. However, the GDP per capita by 2020 had stagnated at $US20,000.

Employment

As of 2008, roughly two-thirds of workers employed in Saudi Arabia were foreigners, and in the private sector the proportion was approximately 90%. In January 2014, the Saudi government claimed it had lowered the 90% rate, doubling the number of Saudi citizens working in the private sector to 1.5 million (compared to 10 million foreign expatriates working in the kingdom).

According to Reuters, economists "estimate only 30–40 percent of working-age Saudis hold jobs or actively seek work", although the official unemployment rate is only around 12 percent. Most Saudis with jobs are employed by the government, but the International Monetary Fund has warned that the government cannot support such a large payroll in the long term. The government has announced a succession of plans since 2000 to deal with the imbalance by "Saudization" of the economy, but the foreign workforce and unemployment has continued to grow. Since the beginning of 2017, however, Saudi Arabia has seen record numbers of foreign workers leaving the country as the Saudi government imposed higher fees on expatriate workers, with more than 677,000 foreigners leaving the kingdom. This has done little to lower the unemployment rate, which rose to 12.9 percent, the highest on record.

One obstacle is social resistance to certain types of employment. Jobs in service and sales are considered totally unacceptable for citizens of Saudi Arabia—both to potential employees and customers.

Non-petroleum resources sector
Saudi Arabia has natural resources other than oil, including small mineral deposits of gold, silver, iron, copper, zinc, manganese, tungsten, lead, sulfur, phosphate, soapstone, and feldspar. The country has a small agricultural sector, primarily in the southwest where annual rainfall averages . The country is one of the world's largest producers of dates. Prior to 2009, wheat was grown using desalinated water for irrigation, but was phased out by 2016 due to costly water usage. As of 2009, the livestock population amounted to 7.4 million sheep, 4.2 million goats, half a million camels, and a quarter of a million cattle.

Although the jobs created by the roughly two million annual Hajj pilgrims do not last long, they employ more people than the oil industry—40,000 temporary jobs (butchers, barbers, coach drivers, etc.)—and generates US$2–3 billion in revenue.

In 2008, the "Initiative for Saudi Agricultural Investment Abroad" was launched, leading to extensive billion-dollar purchases of large tracts of land around the world, including in Ethiopia, Indonesia, Mali, Senegal, and Sudan. Described as land-grabbing by critics, in various instances these purchases have also led to uproars in the respective countries. Competing industrializing nations with food security problems seeking agricultural land include China, South Korea, and India, as well as the Persian Gulf States of Kuwait, Qatar, and the UAE.

In 2016, Mohammad bin Salman announced Saudi Vision 2030, a plan to reduce Saudi Arabia's dependence on oil, diversify its economy, and develop public service sectors such as health, education, infrastructure, recreation, and tourism.

Real estate

One of the fastest growing sectors in the country is real estate, supported by the introduction of real estate investment trusts (REITs). Despite significant growth in the number of REITs, the sector has yet to achieve its full potential due to shortages in both residential and commercial real estate. A number of regional experts believe that most issues will be resolved as the market becomes more mature.

Real estate plays a fundamental role in the country's non-oil economy. In 2016, the value of real estate transactions including sales of existing units amounted to $74.91 billion from 15 October to 16 September. This is a major drop compared to the number of transactions recorded a decade earlier, which reached $239.93 billion. The real estate sector has been driven recently by strong local demand fundamentals and only a small amount of speculation.

Ownership of land property in Saudi Arabia is generally restricted to Saudis, but this is subject to certain qualifications. For example, Gulf Cooperation Council (GCC) nationals and GCC companies have certain rights to own land, subject to a number of restrictions. Foreigners (being non-GCC nationals) are entitled to ownership and investment in real estate with some conditions. A foreign company needs to have a foreign investment license from the Saudi Arabian General Investment Authority (SAGIA) and the owned real estate must be related to a particular investment project for property development. A foreign individual needs to have normal legal residency status and a permit from the Ministry of the Interior to own land or property.

The major expansion in this sector attracted the top real estate consultancies—such as Jones Lang LaSalle, Knight Frank, and Cluttons—who have now opened offices in the country. Beyond this, demand for professional real estate services is attracting regional educators such as DREI to provide courses on Saudi real estate, and even dedicated books focused on the market, such as Saudi Real Estate Companion.

Real estate plays an important role in the Saudi Vision 2030, which maps out significant commitments by the Saudi government relating to housing and the development of land for a variety of uses. In particular, Vision 2030 states: "Where it exists in strategic locations, we will also capitalize on the government's reserves of real estate. We will allocate prime areas within cities for educational institutions, retail, and entertainment centers, large areas along our coasts will be dedicated to tourist projects and appropriate lands will be allocated for industrial projects."

In 2016, new rules were introduced by the Capital Market Authority to form REITs. This aimed at opening the real estate market to a wide range of investors. The REITs consist of units representing the ownership of the underlying real estate. These units are offered to the public and traded on the Saudi Stock Exchange.

The introduction of REITs was a part of the National Transformation program, one of Saudi Arabia's Vision 2030 programs, and has targets of:

 Increasing the real estate sector contribution from GDP of five percent to 10 percent annually.
 Supporting the construction of 1.5 million homes by providing the required private capital.
 Establishing partnerships with private sector developers to develop government land for housing projects.
 Establishing fast-track licenses and special finance packages to encourage private sector investment in housing projects.
In 2019, the Saudi government introduced the Premium Residency scheme, which allows wealthy investors of any nationality to purchase residency and buy and sell real estate.

Automotive
In 2022, the US car company Lucid Motors announced plans to build an electric vehicle manufacturing plant in Jeddah. Construction began in May 2022, and the plant will have capacity for 150,000 vehicles.

Private sector
Saudi Arabia's private sector is dominated by a handful of big businesses in the service sector, primarily in construction and real estate, such as Olayan, Zamil, Almarai, Mobily, STC, SABIC, Sadara, Halliburton, Baker Hughes, Flynas, Hilton, Zain, Yanbu Cement, Alhokair, MBC, Mahfouz, Al Rajhi, and Alfanar. These firms are "heavily dependent on government spending", which is dependent on oil revenues.

From 2003 to 2013, "several key services" were privatized—municipal water supply, electricity, telecommunications—and parts of education and health care, traffic control, and car accident reporting were also privatized. According to Arab News columnist Abdel Aziz Aluwaisheg, "in almost every one of these areas, consumers have raised serious concerns about the performance of these privatized entities."

To provide the best support for the private sector and entrepreneurs, the kingdom announced a decision approved by the Saudi Cabinet in July 2019 allowing businesses in the country to be given the option to remain open 24 hours a day.

Trade 

In April 2000, the government established the Saudi Arabian General Investment Authority to encourage foreign direct investment in Saudi Arabia. Saudi Arabia maintains a negative list of sectors in which foreign investment is prohibited, but the government planned to open some closed sectors such as telecommunications, insurance, and power transmission/distribution over time.

Saudi Arabia became a full World Trade Organization (WTO) member on 11 December 2005. In 2019, the government established the General Authority for Foreign Trade to enhance the kingdom's international commercial and investment activities.

In early July 2020, Saudi Arabia announced the nomination of its former Minister of Economy and Saudi royal court adviser, Mohammad Al-Tuwaijri, for the role of WTO's director-general. The nominations were made public about a month after the WTO reported the kingdom for copyrights infringement following distribution of pirated sports broadcasting content on the state-owned broadcast service, BeoutQ. The nomination of al-Tuwaijri received criticism from human rights groups in mid-August 2020, demanding the rejection of the Saudi nominee due to the kingdom's violation of human rights in addition to his silence over it. On 7 October 2020, Al-Tuwaijri, along with other nominees from the UK and Kenya, lost the bid for the role due to lack of support, as compared to the nominees from Nigeria and South Korea who qualified for the final round of selection.

Saudi Arabia is part of the following trade organizations:
 World Trade Organization (WTO)
 International Monetary Fund (IMF)
 International Chamber of Commerce (ICC)
 International Organization for Standardization (ISO)
 World Customs Organization (WCO)

Challenges
Among the challenges to the Saudi economy include halting or reversing the decline in per capita income, improving education to prepare youth for the workforce and providing them with employment, diversifying the economy, stimulating the private sector and housing construction, and diminishing corruption and inequality. In answer to the question of why the Saudi economy is so dependent on foreign labor, the UN Arab Human Development Report blamed stunted social and economic development inhibited by lack of personal freedom, poor education, government hiring based on factors other than merit, and the exclusion of women.

Income drop

Despite possessing the second largest petroleum reserves in the world, per capita income dropped from approximately $18,000 at the height of the oil boom (1981) to $7,000 in 2001, according to one estimate. As of 2013, due to the rapid population growth of Saudi Arabia, per capita income in Saudi was "a fraction of that of smaller Persian gulf neighbors", even less than petroleum-poor Bahrain.

Unlike most developed countries, where GDP growth is a function of increases in productivity and inputs such as employment, in Saudi Arabia the fluctuation of oil prices is the most important factor in the growth or decline of domestic production. "Saudi reserves are steadily being depleted, and no significant new discoveries have been found to replace them," according to Middle East journalist Karen House. Saudi population grew sevenfold from 1960 to 2010, and petrol prices are subsidized and cost users less than equivalent quantities of bottled water. With production stagnant, growth in population and domestic energy consumption means a decline in per capita income unless oil prices rise to match that growth.

Demographics

The Saudi population is young. About 51% of the total population are under the age of 25 (as of February 2012). According to a 2013 report by the International Monetary Fund, up to 1.6 million young nationals of the Persian Gulf countries (of which Saudi Arabia is the largest) will enter the workforce from 2013 to 2018, but the economies of those countries will have jobs in the private sector for less than half (approximately 600,000).

Education
According to The Economist, the Saudi government has attempted in past years to raise employment by forcing "companies to fill at least 30% of their positions" with Saudi citizens. However, "employers complained bitterly about the lack of skills among young locals; years of rote-learning and religious instruction fail to prepare them for the job market." However, many argue that young Saudis couldn't compete with foreigners due to the low compensation and salaries most companies had used to offer for employees from Asian, Indian subcontinent, and other Arab poor countries, which this cheap labor happily accepts; in addition to the bad work conditions, culture, and environment present in most of the Saudi private sector, largely due to the fact that it was initially modeled to accommodate very-low-income employees from other nations, not the Saudi medium-income and somewhat highly educated population. As a consequence, "the quota has now been dropped and replaced with a more flexible system".

According to scholar David Commins, the kingdom depends "on huge numbers of expatriate workers to fill technical and administrative positions" in part because of an educational system that, despite "generous budgets", has suffered from "poorly trained teachers, low retention rates, lack of rigorous standards, weak scientific and technical instruction and excessive attention to religious subjects".

A 2015 survey conducted by Bayt.com showed that over a quarter (28%) of professionals in North Africa and the Middle East believe that there is a skills shortage in their country of residence. This belief was even more prominent among respondents in Saudi Arabia (39%).

Innovation

Saudi has not been a hotbed of technological innovation. The number of Saudi patents registered in the United States between 1977 and 2010 came to 382—less than twelve per year—compared to 84,840 patents for South Korea or 20,620 for Israel during that period. However, in 2017 Saudi Arabia was granted 664 patents by the United States Patent and Trademark Office, ranking 23rd among 92 countries. The number of granted patents was double that of all Arab countries combined during the same period. Saudi Arabia hopes to increase technological innovation, particularly with the King Abdullah University of Science and Technology, and thus to stimulate the economy.

Bureaucracy

Business journalist Karen House criticized the Saudi bureaucracy, explaining that someone seeking to start a business in Saudi Arabia:

Corruption

The cost of maintaining the Royal Family is estimated by some to be about US$10 billion per year.

A 2005 survey by the Riyadh Chamber of Commerce found that 77% of businessmen polled felt they had to 'bypass' the law to conduct their operations. By 2012, "businessmen say it has only gotten worse".

Saudi Arabia has been severely criticized for failing to tackle money laundering and international terrorism financing. A report released by the Financial Action Task Force on 24 September 2018, says, "Saudi Arabia is not effectively investigating and prosecuting individuals involved in larger scale or professional [money laundering] activity" and is "not effectively confiscating the proceeds of crime".

Poverty

Estimates of the number of Saudis below the poverty line range from between 12.7% and 25%. Press reports and private estimates as of 2013 "suggest that between 2 million and 4 million" of the country's native Saudis live on "less than about $530 a month" – about $17 a day – considered the poverty line in Saudi Arabia.

The Saudi state discourages calling attention to or complaining about poverty. In December 2011, days after the Arab Spring uprisings, the Saudi interior ministry detained reporter Feros Boqna and two colleagues (Hussam al-Drewesh and Khaled al-Rasheed) and held them for almost two weeks for questioning after they uploaded a 10-minute video on the topic (Mal3ob 3alena, or 'We are being cheated') to YouTube. Authors of the video claim that 22% of Saudis are considered to be poor (2009) and 70% of Saudis do not own their houses. 
Statistics on the issue are not available through the UN resources because the Saudi government does not issue poverty figures. Observers researching the issue prefer to stay anonymous because of the risk of being arrested, like Feras Boqna.

Housing

50% of Saudi Arabia's citizens owned their own home in 2017, a rise from 30% in 2011 but below the international average rate of 70%. In 2011, analysts estimated 500,000 new homes per year were needed to match the growth in Saudi population, but as of early 2014 only 300,000 to 400,000 houses per year were being built.

One problem is that the government Real Estate Development Fund (REDF)—which provides 81% of all loans for housing—had an 18-year waiting list for loans due to pent-up demand. Another is that the REDF's maximum loan is 500,000 SR ($133,000), while in 2012 the average price for a small free-standing home in Riyadh is more than double that—1.23 million SR ($328,000). However, as part of the economic reforms undertaken by the government to enhance national living standards, new funding solutions have been established to boost the mortgages for existing and new borrowers to help finance their housing plans. This was announced in August 2018 by the Minister of Housing, Mr. Majed Al-Hogail.

A major reason for the high cost of housing is the high cost of land. In urban areas, the price of land has been bid up because nearly all of it is owned by the Saudi elite (members of the royal family or other wealthy Saudis), who have lobbied the government for land "giveaways". Landlords have seen prices rocket by 50% from 2011 to 2013. The owners benefit from these price increases as they hold the land for future development. To deal with the key "land banking" issue, the Minister of Housing suggested in 2013 that vacant property within city limits could be subject to a tax. However, no firm plans for any tax have been unveiled.

Further diversification

According to journalist Karen House, "every" Saudi five-year plan "since the first one in 1970" has called for diversifying the economy beyond oil, but with marginal success.

As of 2007, manufacturing outside of the petroleum industry contributed 10% to Saudi Arabian GDP and less than 6% of total employment.

Private sector growth

In 2018, the imposition of a 5% value-added tax brought private-sector growth to a halt. Consumer spending was also restrained after a sharp increase in prices for energy, electricity, and water earlier in 2018. The kingdom witnessed a mass departure of around 750,000 foreign workers after imposing new government levies on ex-pat workers. The government is also forcing small-business owners to hire Saudi nationals at comparatively higher wages than foreign workers. Gaining money from large, direct foreign investments is also not working in favor of the government. Rich Saudis are reluctant to invest within the kingdom due to the fear of triggering government scrutiny.

On 11 May 2020, the government announced that it would triple the kingdom's VAT on goods and services, raising it from 5% to 15%. It also stated that the increase in VAT—introduced due to the country's current financial crisis due to plummeting oil prices and impact of coronavirus—would also be followed by a cut in monthly allowance for state workers worth approximately $266, and financial benefits for contractors. 
Aramco decreased the production of its Arab Light grade of crude oil by a significant amount to be shipped to Asia. The firm also cut down oil pricing for its US buyers following wavering demand for fuel due to the global relapse of the coronavirus pandemic.

According to the General Authority for Statistics, Saudi Arabia's inflation accelerated to 6.2% in August 2020, as compared to the same month last year. The report states that the annual inflation rate increased from only 0.5% (in June) to 6.1% (in July), before the increase of VAT to 15% from 5% was introduced, effective from 1 July 2020.

Investment 
Saudi Arabia has two stock exchanges, the Tadawul and The Saudi Parallel Market (Nomu), whose financial markets are regulated by the Capital Market Authority. The stock market capitalization of listed companies in Saudi Arabia is valued at $2.22 trillion. According to the International Institute for Management Development, Saudi Arabia experienced the largest improvement in business competitiveness of all countries in 2019; the kingdom rose 13 places to 26th in the world.

Doing business
Saudi Arabia is among the countries with the most notable improvement in doing business, according to the World Bank Group's "Doing Business" 2020 report. The country jumped 30 places to rank 62nd in ease of doing business, compared to the previous year. Previously, the kingdom had been declining in the overall rankings, from 22nd in 2013 to 92nd in 2018.

According to the World Bank in 2019, Saudi Arabia had conducted reforms in eight areas of business: (1) starting a business, (2) getting construction permits, (3) getting electricity, (4) getting credit, (5) protecting minority investors, (6) trading across borders, (7) enforcing contracts, and (8) resolving insolvency.

Saudi Arabian companies dominate 2009's "MEED 100", with companies listed on the Tadawul accounting for 29 out of the region's 100 biggest publicly quoted companies ranked by market capitalization. Just three of the 20 companies that have dropped out of the top 100 over the past year are listed on the Saudi stock exchange.

Foreigners are allowed to wholly own limited liability companies in the majority of industries. Non-Saudi nationals are required to obtain a foreign capital investment license from the Saudi Arabian General Investment Authority.

With a total of 291 foreign investor licenses issued in the second quarter of 2019, the kingdom has witnessed an increase in international investment, reflecting the economic reforms under the Saudi Vision 2030. Obtaining a foreign investor license became more straightforward as it requires only two documents, and it is processed in three hours.

Controversies 
Sharmarke Gaani, a Somali businessman, travelled to Saudi Arabia on 25 January 2021 to spread his home-health business in the country, which he had visited twice since 2017. On his arrival, the New Albany businessman faced 3-day detention for no discernible reason. According to his statements, the detention facility was cramped, cold, and didn't offer masks despite housing 8 other inmates during the COVID-19 pandemic. Gaani claimed that he suffered "mentally, physically and emotionally" and just wanted "justice". His call to the United States consulate in the country went unanswered. On the third day of his detention, Gaani was informed that he could leave, without receiving any explanation or apology for the incident.

Companies

Saudi Aramco
Saudi Aramco (officially the Saudi Arabian Oil Co.) is Saudi Arabia's national oil, petroleum, and natural gas company headquartered in Dhahran. Saudi Aramco was listed for public trading on 10 December 2019 and had a valuation as of US$2 trillion as of 12 December 2019.

The company operates the world's largest single hydrocarbon network, the Master Gas System. Saudi Aramco owns the Ghawar Field, the world's largest oil field, and the Shaybah Field, another one of the world's largest oil fields.

On 16 November 2020, Saudi Aramco announced hiring banks to sell dollar-denominated bonds with the aim of improving finances after the coronavirus pandemic caused a sharp fall in the global demand for crude oil. Aramco's multi-tranche offer was set to run between 3 and 50 years, depending on the market conditions. The banks hired for the transaction included Citi Bank, Goldman Sachs International, HSBC, JP Morgan, Morgan Stanley and NCB Capital. Other banks involved in the deal included BNP Paribas, BOC International, BofA Securities, Credit Agricole, First Abu Dhabi Bank, Mizuho, MUFG, SMBC Nikko and Societe Generale.

In 2021, Saudi Aramco made a net-income of 95.5 billion riyals ($25.5 billion) in the second quarter alone, which was the highest level since 2018.

SABIC
The Saudi Arabian Basic Industries Corporation (SABIC was established by a royal decree in 1976 to produce chemicals, polymers, and fertilizers. In 2008, SABIC was Asia's largest (in terms of market capitalization) and most profitable publicly listed non-oil company, the world's fourth-largest petrochemical company, the second-largest producer of ethylene glycol and methanol in the world, the third-largest producer of polyethylene and overall the fourth-largest producer of polypropylene and polyolefin. It ranked 186th as the world's largest corporation on the Fortune Global 500 for 2009. Standard & Poor's and Fitch Ratings claimed SABIC to be the world's largest producer of polymers and the Persian Gulf region's largest steel producer for 2005 and assigned SABIC an "A" corporate credit rating. In 2008, Fortune 500 ranking records SABIC revenues at $40.2 billion, profits at $5.8 billion, and assets standing at $72.4 billion.

Ma'aden (company)
Ma'aden was formed as a Saudi joint stock company on 23 March 1997 for the purpose of facilitating the development of Saudi Arabia's mineral resources. Ma'aden's activities have focused on its active gold business which has grown in recent years to include the operation of five gold mines: Mahd Ad Dahab, Al Hajar, Sukhaybarat, Bulghah, and Al Amar. Ma'aden is now expanding its activities beyond its gold business with the development of phosphates, aluminium, and other projects. In addition, since its formation, Ma'aden (through the Ministry of Petroleum and Mineral Resources) has collaborated with the government and local legislators to develop a regulatory framework for the governance of the mining industry.

ICT Services 

Saudi Arabia experienced a boom in computer use since deregulation in 2002. The number of PCs per capita grew from 13% of the population owning a computer in 2002 to nearly 43% in 2005, leapfrogging the rest of West Asia. By 2018, 50.57% of the population owned computers. The electrical and electronic market was estimated to be around $3.5 billion in 2004.

The Saudi ICT sector has grown significantly over the last decade and is still showing strong growth. In 2012, ICT sector spending was recorded at SAR 94 billion, with 13.9% annual growth, and reached approximately SAR 102 billion in 2013, with approximately 14% annual growth.

The e-commerce market was estimated at just over $1 billion in 2001, and grew to an estimated $7.7 billion in 2021.

See also
 List of Saudi cities by GDP per capita

References

Notes

Further reading

External links 
 Saudi Arabia. The World Factbook. Central Intelligence Agency.
 
 Saudi Arabia Export, Import, Trade Balance

 
Economy of the Arab League
Saudi Arabia
Economic history of Saudi Arabia
Economic history